Overlord is an anime series based on the light novel series of the same name written by Kugane Maruyama and illustrated by so-bin. On May 8, 2021, a fourth season was announced with the staff and cast members returning to reprise their roles. It aired from July 5 to September 27, 2022. The opening theme is "HOLLOW HUNGER" by OxT while the ending theme is "No Man's Dawn" by Mayu Maeshima. On July 18, 2022, Crunchyroll announced an English dub for the fourth season, which began streaming on July 19.


Episode list

Notes

References

Overlord episode lists
2022 Japanese television seasons